Otto Sarony (1850–1903) was a portrait photographer and the owner of a celebrity photography business. Napoleon Sarony, the premier theatrical photographer of the 19th century, was his father. Sarony the Younger, as he was known, continued the family business. His photography business put out photos of Evelyn Nesbit, Clara Blandick, Richard Bennett, Elsie Leslie and other stars of stage and screen as well as other celebrities such as boxer Jack Johnson under his name. The actual photographers were uncredited (as he was when he worked for his father).

References

1850 births
1903 deaths
American photographers
American people of Canadian descent